This is a list of moths of the families Epermeniidae, Eriocottidae, Tineidae and Tischeriidae that are found in India. It also acts as an index to the species articles and forms part of the full List of moths of India.

Family Epermeniidae
Epermenia leucomantis Meyrick, 1917 
Epermenia macescens  Meyrick, 1917 
Ochromolopis chelyodes (Meyrick, 1910)

Eriocottidae
Dacryphanes cyanastra Meyrick, 1907

Family Tineidae
Amphixystis gyracma (Meyrick, 1915)
Amphixystis oxymoris (Meyrick, 1916)
Amphixystis protelesta (Meyrick, 1915)
Amphixystis rotata (Meyrick, 1915)
Amphixystis thapsonota (Meyrick, 1915)
Cervaria xylinella Walker, 1866
Cimitra seclusella Walker, 1864
Cladarodes peloptera Meyrick, 1910
Crypsithyris fissella
Crypsithyris longicornis
Crypsithyris mesodyas Meyrick, 1907
Dasyses rugosella
Drimylastis telamonia
Edosa opsigona ( Meyrick, 1911)
Epactris alcaea
Erechthias dissimulans
Erechthias heliotoxa
Erechthias lampadacma
Erechthias melanostropha
Erechthias minuscula (Walsingham, 1897)
Erechthias pachygramma
Erechthias scorpiura
Erechthias spodomicta
Eucrotala nucleata
Eudarcia celidopa
Eudarcia cuniculata
Eudarcia deferens
Gaphara plana
Gerontha captiosella
Graphicoptila dissociata (Meyrick, 1922)
Haplotinea insectella (Fabricius, 1794)
Harmaclona tephrantha
Hyladaula claviformis
Hyladaula perniciosa
Ippa inceptrix  (Meyrick, 1916)
Ippa lepras  (Meyrick, 1917)
Ippa megalopa  (Meyrick, 1915)
Ippa plana  (Meyrick, 1920)
Ippa sollicata  (Meyrick, 1917)
Ippa vacivella  Walker, 1864
Kangerosithyris kotomsarensis Skalski, 1992
Machaeropteris encotopa Meyrick, 1922
Machaeropteris synaphria Meyrick, 1922
Machaeropteris turbata Meyrick, 1922
Monopis crocicapitella (Clemens, 1859)
Monopis dicycla Meyrick, 1910
Monopis longella  (Walker, 1863)
Monopis monachella (Hübner, 1796)
Monopis trimaculella
Monopis sertifera Meyrick, 1910
Morophaga sistrata
Nemapogon asyntacta (Meyrick, 1917)
Opogona aemula Meyrick, 1915
Opogona anaclina Meyrick, 1915
Opogona chalinota Meyrick, 1910
Opogona choleropis Meyrick, 1920 (Andaman)
Opogona citriseca Meyrick, 1928 (Andaman)
Opogona clinomima (Meyrick, 1918)
Opogona dramatica Meyrick, 1911
Opogona elaitis Meyrick, 1911
Opogona flavofasciata (Stainton, 1859)
Opogona fumiceps
Opogona hylarcha Meyrick, 1928
Opogona iolychna (Meyrick, 1920)
Opogona isoclina Meyrick, 1907
Opogona isotalanta Meyrick, 1930
Opogona lamprocrossa Meyrick, 1928 (Andaman)
Opogona liparopis Meyrick, 1922
Opogona loculata Meyrick, 1915
Opogona lutigena Meyrick, 1915
Opogona molybdis Meyrick, 1915
Opogona monosticta (Meyrick, 1915)
Opogona pandora Meyrick, 1911
Opogona percnodes Meyrick, 1910
Opogona praecincta Meyrick, 1916
Opogona protographa Meyrick, 1911
Opogona protomima (Meyrick, 1918)
Opogona sacchari (Bojer, 1856)
Opogona scabricoma Meyrick, 1934
Opogona succulenta Meyrick, 1931 (Andaman)
Opogona taochroa Meyrick, 1934
Opogona tergemina Meyrick, 1915
Opogona xanthocrita Meyrick, 1911
Opogona zygodonta Meyrick, 1931
Oxylychna euryzona Meyrick 1920
Peristactis taraxias Meyrick, 1916
Phaeoses chalinota  (Meyrick, 1910)
Phereoeca allutella Rebel, 1892
Phereoeca spharagistis (Meyrick, 1911)
Phereoeca uterella (Walsingham, 1897)
Platysceptra corticina (T. B. Fletcher, 1921)
Platysceptra tineoides (Walsingham, 1886)
Proterospastis inquisitrix
Pyloetis mimosae (Stainton, 1859)
Rhinophyllis dasychiras Meyrick, 1936
Scalmatica albofasciella (Stainton 1859)
Scalmatica rhicnopa Meyrick, 1919
Setomorpha rutella Zeller, 1852
Tinea antricola Meyrick, 1924
Tinea cherota
Tinea nestoria Stainton
Tinea pellionella (Linnaeus, 1758)
Tinea pyrosoma Meyrick, 1924
Tinea subalbidella
Tineovertex antidroma
Trachycentra elaeotropha
Trachytyla xylophthora (Meyrick, 1922)
Trichophaga robinsoni Gaedike & Karsholt, 2001
Trichophaga mormopis Meyrick, 1935
Trichophaga tapetzella (Linnaeus, 1758)
Trissochyta acraspis
Wegneria cerodelta (Meyrick, 1911) 
Wegneria encharacta  (Meyrick, 1915)
Wegneria impotens  (Meyrick, 1915)
Wegneria lachanitis (Meyrick, 1906)
Wegneria oxydesma  (Meyrick, 1918) 
Wegneria plasturga  (Meyrick, 1911)
Wegneria spherotoma  (Meyrick, 1911)

Tischeriidae
Tischeria ptarmica Meyrick, 1908

References
Meyrick, 1908. XXXIX. New Micro-Lepidoptera from India and Burma. - Rec. Ind. Mus. 2: 396
Meyrick, E. (1910).XXII. Notes and Descriptions of Indian Micro-Lepidoptera.
Fletcher & Meyrick, 1924. Records of the Indian Museum, Vol.xxVI, Part I:113-114

 
x
M